Al otro lado is a 2005 documentary film about illegal immigration and drug trafficking between Mexico and the United States, addressing issues facing people north and south of the border, though the film mostly focuses on Magdiel, a 23-year-old fisherman and aspiring composer who dreams of a better life in the United States.

Al otro lado was produced and directed by Natalia Almada and was aired as part of PBS's POV series in 2006. It was met with critical acclaim and received a 78% rating on Rotten Tomatoes. It also received the Special Jury Prize and the Best Editing Award at the Cine Ceará Film Festival and was nominated for the Gotham Award for Best Film Not Playing in a Theater Near You.

References

External links 
 P.O.V. Al Otro Lado - PBS's site dedicated to the film
 

Films about Mexican drug cartels
2005 films
2005 television films
Documentary films about immigration to the United States
Documentary films about the illegal drug trade
2005 documentary films
2000s Mexican films